Pathlight School is a special school for high-functioning children with autism in Singapore. Founded in 2004, it is run by the non-profit Autism Resource Centre and comprises one half of the national educational provision for autistic children. The school coaches students in social and life skills, teaches them mainstream curriculum subjects and prepares them for employment in an autism friendly environment. With more than 1000 pupils enrolled, the school has been noted for its achievements in special education in Singapore.

History
In 2003, the Autism Resource Centre (ARC) launched a project to provide comprehensive support for autistic Singaporeans, which included plans to set up the first autism-focused special school in Singapore. The ARC collaborated with the Rainbow Centre over a period of five months to renovate the temporary campus, recruit school staff, decide on the school values and develop the school programmes. 

After opening in January 2004 with 10 teachers and 41 students, Pathlight School conducted charity walks, merchandise sales and other events to raise funds for the introduction of more programmes for an expanding intake. In 2007, two teachers from Pathlight School won the inaugural Most Outstanding Special Education Teacher Award and Most Innovative Special Education Teacher Award, given by the Singaporean Ministry of Education and National Council of Social Service. In 2009, the Autism Association of Singapore launched a second autism-focused special school, Eden School, and the two schools formed a partnership. The following year, Pathlight School moved to its permanent campus and announced plans to develop student internship programmes, build an information technology centre, and set up a lifelong learning club for alumni.

Campus
The permanent campus of Pathlight School at Ang Mo Kio Avenue 10, which was constructed by W Architects and cost S$34 million to build, spans . Its facilities include 45 classrooms, four computer labs, three courtyards, an industrial kitchen and a multi-purpose area, as well as special art, music and design rooms. The campus was designed to offer students "dignity" and an autism friendly environment. For example, the walls and floors have a simple colour scheme, to avoid triggering sensory overload, while the taps in the canteen are slightly different from each other to help students learn to adopt less rigid routines. Due to limited facilities, some academic lessons, known as satellite classes, are conducted by Pathlight teachers at nearby mainstream schools, including Mayflower Secondary School, Peirce Secondary School, and Yio Chu Kang Secondary School.

Programmes
Unlike most special schools in Singapore, which place a lighter emphasis on academics, Pathlight School uses the same academic curriculum as mainstream primary and secondary schools. An exception is that mother tongue lessons are replaced with classes covering social and life skills. The school accommodates the needs of students with smaller class sizes, staff trained to handle autistic children, more visual teaching methods, more predictable environments and individual education plans for each student. 

Satellite classes and special events give students regular opportunities to interact with neurotypical (non-autistic) peers from mainstream schools; exceptional students are allowed to attend classes with mainstream students for some subjects. To prepare students for employment, Pathlight School runs computing courses, a design studio and a cafe staffed by students. The school also produces book compilations of thoughts written by students, conducts exhibitions of student artwork and sells merchandise made by students, to help students develop useful skills, raise funds for the school and raise awareness of autism. In addition, Pathlight School has hosted autism events such as the WeCAN Learning Congress 2010, where over 20 international experts shared their best practices in autism care with about 560 delegates.

Students
As of 2010, Pathlight School had an enrolment of over 500 students, of whom about 40% had their school fees of S$500 subsidised. The school caters to students with autism aged 6 to 18, who are able to access the mainstream curriculum because they are high-functioning, but would have difficulty learning in a mainstream school. Most students take mainstream national examinations, such as the PSLE and O Levels, with results comparable to students from mainstream schools, and some enter mainstream tertiary institutions. About 10% of students take a vocational track and may transfer to Eden School, which caters to lower-functioning autistic children and focuses on vocational training. Students from Pathlight School have participated in—and won—national competitions such as the National Youth Business Challenge 2010.

In 2015, the student enrolment increased to 1,000 students, with 1,074 students in 2016. The numbers have been growing since then. As of 2023, there are 1,945 students.

Management
Pathlight School is run by the Autism Resource Centre, a non-profit organisation that also offers early intervention, therapy and training for persons with autism in Singapore. The school employs 81 staff, including teachers, therapists and autism consultants, and the school board is headed by founder, ARC president and Member of Parliament Denise Phua. Operating costs of the school are paid by the Ministry of Education and National Council of Social Service, while other costs, estimated at S$5 million per year, are funded through fees, donations, merchandise sales and fundraising events. Under the partnership between Pathlight School and Eden School, the two schools have a centralised admission system and share various resources; together, they form the national provision of education for children across the autism spectrum.

References

External links
 

Schools in Ang Mo Kio
Educational institutions established in 2004
Non-profit organisations based in Singapore
Schools for people on the autistic spectrum
Special education schools in Singapore
2004 establishments in Singapore
Autism-related organizations